Kamran Khan Bangash is a Pakistani politician who had been a member of the Provincial Assembly of Khyber Pakhtunkhwa from August 2018 till January 2023.

Early life and education
He was born on 5 December 1987 in Hangu, Pakistan.

He received a degree of Bachelor of Computer Science in 2008.

Political career

Bangash joined Pakistan Tehreek-e-Insaf (PTI) in 2006 and headed the party's social media in Khyber Pakhtunkhwa from 2007 to 2010.

He was elected to the Provincial Assembly of Khyber Pakhtunkhwa as a candidate of PTI from Constituency PK-77 (Peshawar-XII) in 2018 Pakistani general election.

On 26 August 2018, he was named by the PTI as Provincial Minister of Khyber Pakhtunkhwa for Information Technology. However his name was dropped from the cabinet on the day of oath taking ceremony on 29 August. On 30 August, he was named as Special Assistant to the Chief Minister of Khyber Pakhtunkhwa Mahmood Khan on Information Technology. On 14 September 2018, he was appointed as special assistant to the chief minister on science and technology and information technology.
On 11 July 2020, He has been appointed  as Provincial Minister for Information and has been considered as the best Information minister of the decade for the province.

Later in the same year on Friday, 18 September 2020, he was given the responsibility of revamping the Ministry of Higher Education, Archives, & Libraries.

Currently he is looking after the following 2 important ministries of the Khyber Pakhtunkhwa province.

 Ministry of Higher Education, Archives, & Libraries
 Ministry of Information & Press Releases

References

Living people
Pakistan Tehreek-e-Insaf MPAs (Khyber Pakhtunkhwa)
1987 births